Rhochmopterum parva is a species of tephritid or fruit flies in the genus Rhochmopterum of the family Tephritidae.

Distribution
Tanzania.

References

Tephritinae
Insects described in 1974
Diptera of Africa